The following table indicates the party of elected officials in the U.S. state of Louisiana:
Governor
Lieutenant Governor
Secretary of State
Attorney General
State Treasurer
Auditor (until 1960) / Comptroller (1960–74; not an elected office after 1974)
Commissioner of Agriculture and Forestry
Commissioner of Insurance
Commissioner of Elections (office abolished; in existence 1960–2004)

The table also indicates the historical party composition in the:
State Senate
State House of Representatives
State delegation to the U.S. Senate
State delegation to the U.S. House of Representatives

For years in which a presidential election was held, the table indicates which party's nominees received the state's electoral votes.

1803–1903

1904–1951

1952–2003

2004–present

References

See also
 Law and government in Louisiana
 Politics of Louisiana
 Elections in Louisiana

Politics of Louisiana
Government of Louisiana
Louisiana